Mamadou Bagayoko (born 31 December 1989) is an Ivorian professional footballer who plays as a defender. He is currently playing for Rebecq in the Belgian Division 2.

Club career
Born in Abidjan, Ivory Coast, Bagayoko began his career at Ivorian club Africa Sports. In the summer of 2008, he moved to Europe signing for ŠK Slovan Bratislava. In January 2009, he was loaned to Artmedia Petržalka, where he played 7 matches in the Slovak First League.

In June 2009, Bagayoko returned to Slovan Bratislava. He played his first match for the club on 2 August 2009, against MFK Košice, coming on as a substitute for Martin Dobrotka late in the second half. On 24 July 2010, he scored his first goal against MŠK Žilina in a 2–2 draw.

In January 2019, he was loaned to Red Star from Mechelen until the end of the season. During the 2019-20 season, back at Mechelen, Bagayoko was not part of the first-team squad and only played for the reserves throughout the whole season. At the end of the season, his contract was terminated despite running until 2021.

International career
Bagayoko represented his country at the 2008 Olympic Games and played from Toulon Tournament 2007 until 2008 for the under-21 team. He made his debut for the Ivory Coast senior team in a 0–0 tie with Sierra Leone in 2015.

Career statistics

International

References

External links
 
 
 
 
 
 

1989 births
Living people
Footballers from Abidjan
Association football defenders
Ivorian footballers
Ivory Coast international footballers
Olympic footballers of Ivory Coast
Footballers at the 2008 Summer Olympics
Africa Sports d'Abidjan players
Ivorian expatriate footballers
Expatriate footballers in Belgium
Expatriate footballers in France
Expatriate footballers in Slovakia
Expatriate footballers in Romania
Slovak Super Liga players
ŠK Slovan Bratislava players
Ivorian expatriate sportspeople in Belgium
Ivorian expatriate sportspeople in France
Ivorian expatriate sportspeople in Slovakia
Ivorian expatriate sportspeople in Romania
FC Petržalka players
Sint-Truidense V.V. players
Oud-Heverlee Leuven players
K.V. Mechelen players
Red Star F.C. players
FC U Craiova 1948 players
R.U.S. Rebecquoise players
Belgian Pro League players
Challenger Pro League players
Ligue 2 players
Liga I players
2017 Africa Cup of Nations players
2019 Africa Cup of Nations players